Kravtsovka is a rural locality (a khutor) in Maryevskoye Rural Settlement, Olkhovatsky District, Voronezh Oblast, Russia. The population was 51 as of 2010.

Geography 
Kravtsovka is located 27 km northwest of Olkhovatka (the district's administrative centre) by road. Limarev is the nearest rural locality.

References 

Rural localities in Olkhovatsky District